The Black River is a river in Simcoe County, the District Municipality of Muskoka, the City of Kawartha Lakes, and Haliburton County in Central Ontario, Canada. It is part of the Great Lakes Basin, and is a right tributary of the Severn River.

Course
The river begins at Hosiery Lake and flows southwest to Raven Lake, then passes under Ontario Highway 35 and into the municipality of Lake of Bays, District Municipality of Muskoka. It continues southwest into Minden Hills, Haliburton County, then back into Muskoka District in the municipality of Bracebridge, passes under Ontario Highway 118 and flows by the community of Vankoughnet, and enters the city of Kawartha Lakes. The river turns west, flows over the Ragged Rapids, exits Kawartha Lakes, briefly forms the border between Simcoe County and Muskoka District, flows through the Big Eddy, then reaches the community of Cooper's Falls in the municipality of Ramara, Simcoe County. It turns south, then heads west, takes in the left tributary Head River, turns north, and reaches its mouth at the Severn River's easternmost outflow from the latter river's source at Lake Couchiching. The Severn River flows to Lake Huron.

History
It is a common misconception that the Black River flows into Lake Couchiching. This was a problem for lumbermen in the 1860s, who established the Rama Timber Transport Company, to move logs from the Black River to Lake Couchiching.

Tributaries
St. John Creek (left)
Head River (left)
Riley Creek (right)
Montgomery Creek (left)
Anson Creek (left)
Andrews Creek (left)
Cache Creek (left)
Ketch Creek (left)
Clear Creek (right)
Cinder Creek (left)
South Jean Creek (left)
Orillia Creek (right)
Horse Creek (left)

See also
List of rivers of Ontario

References

Sources

Rivers of Simcoe County
Rivers of Kawartha Lakes
Rivers of Muskoka District
Rivers of Haliburton County